Herbert Huber was an Italian luger who competed in the early 1980s. A natural track luger, he won a silver medal in the men's doubles event at the 1981 FIL European Luge Natural Track Championships in Niedernsill, Austria.

References
Natural track European Championships results 1970-2006.

Year of birth missing (living people)
Living people
Missing middle or first names
Sportspeople from Südtirol
Italian male lugers